The term classless society refers to a society in which no one is born into a social class. Distinctions of wealth, income, education, culture, or social network might arise and would only be determined by individual experience and achievement in such a society.
Thus, the concept posits not the absence of a social hierarchy but the uninheritability of class status. 
Helen Codere defines social class as a segment of the community, the members of which show a common social position in a hierarchical ranking. Codere suggest that a true class-organized society is one in which the hierarchy of prestige and social status is divisible into groups. Each group with its own social, economic, attitudinal and cultural characteristics, and each having differential degrees of power in community decision.

Since determination of life outcome by birth class has proved historically difficult to avoid, advocates of a classless society such as anarchists, communists and libertarian socialists propose various means to achieve and maintain it. They attach varying degrees of importance to it as an end in their overall programs/philosophy.

For the opposite see class society.

Classlessness 
The term classlessness has been used to describe different social phenomena.

In societies where classes have been abolished, it is usually the result of a voluntary decision by the membership to form such a society to abolish a pre-existing class structure in an existing society or to form a new one without any. This would include communes of the modern period such as various American utopian communities or the kibbutzim as well as revolutionary and political acts at the nation-state level such as the Paris Commune or the Russian Revolution. The abolition of social classes and the establishment of a classless society is the primary goal of anarchism, communism and libertarian socialism.

According to Ulrich Beck, classlessness is achieved with class struggle: "It is the collective success with class struggle which institutionalizes individualization and dissolves the culture of classes, even under conditions of radicalizing inequalities". Essentially, classlessness will exist when the inequalities and injustice out ranks societies idea of the need for social ranking and hierarchy.

While Becker and Andreas Hadjar argue that class identity has weakened, in that "class position no longer generates a deep sense of identity and belonging", others maintain that class continues to affect lives, such as how children's success in education correlates with their parents' wealth.

Marxist definition 

In Marxist theory, tribal hunter-gatherer society, primitive communism, was classless. Everyone was equal in a basic sense as a member of the tribe and the different functional assignments of the primitive mode of production, howsoever rigid and stratified they might be, did not and could not simply because of the numbers produce a class society as such. With the transition to agriculture, the possibility to make a surplus product, i.e. to produce more than what is necessary to satisfy one's immediate needs, developed in the course of development of the productive forces. According to Marxism, this also made it possible for a class society to develop because the surplus product could be used to nourish a ruling class which did not participate in production.

Libertarian socialism 
Libertarian socialism, also called left-libertarianism, social anarchism, social libertarianism and socialist libertarianism, is a group of anti-authoritarian socialist political philosophies that rejects socialism as the centralised state ownership and control of the economy, which they regard as state capitalism. Political philosophy is the study of fundamental questions about the government, state, justice, politics, liberty and the enforcement of a legal code by an authoritative body. According to Charles Larmore, the second approach sees political philosophy as the freedom to discipline one-self from the basic features of the human condition that make up the reality of political life.

Libertarianism is a collection of political philosophies and movements that uphold liberty as a core principle. Libertarians seek to maximize political freedom and autonomy, emphasizing freedom of choice, voluntary association and individual judgment. Libertarians share a skepticism of authority and state power, but they diverge on the scope of their opposition to existing political and economic systems. Various schools of libertarian thought offer a range of views regarding the legitimate functions of state and private power, often calling for the restriction or dissolution of coercive social institutions.

Past and present political philosophies and movements commonly described as libertarian socialist include anarchism (especially anarcho-communism, anarcho-syndicalism, collectivist anarchism and mutualism) as well as autonomism, communalism, participism, guild socialism, revolutionary syndicalism and libertarian Marxist philosophies such as council communism and Luxemburgism as well as some versions of utopian socialism and individualist anarchism.

See also 

 Bourgeoisie
 Communist revolution
 Corporate power
 Equality of outcome
 False consciousness
 Middle class
 New class
 Proletariat
 Social equality
 Social organization
 Social status
 Socialism
 Stateless communism
 Working class

References 

 Anarchism (2015). In The Hutchinson Unabridged Encyclopedia with Atlas and Weather Guide. Abington, United Kingdom: Helicon.
 Beitzinger, A. J.; Bromberg, H. (2013). Anarchism. In Fastiggi, R. L. (ed.). New Catholic Encyclopedia Supplement 2012-2013. Detroit: Gale. Vol. 1. pp. 70–72.

Ideologies
Marxist theory
Social classes
Social systems